Pir Bolagh (also Romanized as Pīr Bolāgh; also known as Pir Bulāq and Pīr Bulāqī) is a village in Nowjeh Mehr Rural District, Siah Rud District, Jolfa County, East Azerbaijan Province, Iran. At the 2006 census, its population was 17, in 4 families. In Azerbaijani Turkish Pir is used to holy fountain and Bulaq means fountain, So PirBulaq means a fountain named Pir. Early inhabitants of Pirbulaq were Malekzadeh Pribolaghi, Pourmohammad,... .

References 

Populated places in Jolfa County